Hargraves is a village in Central West New South Wales, Australia. At the 2011 census, Hargraves had a population of 338.

It lies within the traditional lands of the Wiradjuri people.

Initially known as Louisa Creek, it was renamed Hargraves after Edward Hargraves. It owes its origins to gold mining, which occurred there from the early 1850s.

References

External links

Towns in New South Wales
Towns in the Central West (New South Wales)
Central Tablelands
Mining towns in New South Wales